Crymych is an electoral ward in Pembrokeshire, Wales. The ward consists of the communities of Crymych and Eglwyswrw. 
 
A ward of Pembrokeshire County Council since 1995 it was previously a ward of the former Preseli Pembrokeshire District Council. The ward population at the 2011 census was 2,463.

See also
 List of electoral wards in Pembrokeshire

References

Pembrokeshire electoral wards